Mujib Kassim (Amharic: ሙጂብ ቃሲም, born 19 October 1995) is an Ethiopian professional footballer who plays as a forward for Ethiopian Premier League club Hawassa Kenema and the Ethiopian national football team.

Club career 
Mujib left his first club Hawassa City in 2016 opting to sign with Adama City. Mujib signed with Fasil Kenema in 2018 after leaving his On 8 August 2021, It was reported that Mujib was on the verge of a move to Algerian club JS Kabylie after leading Fasil Kenema to the Ethiopia Premier League title the prior season.

Mujib still had one year left on his contract and was expected to lead Fasil in the Caf Champions League after his goal scoring heroics for the champions, but the lure of good earnings was too much to ignore. Fasil Kenema have given their blessings for the star player's move, but details surrounding the deal were not made public.

References

External links

1995 births
Living people
Association football forwards
Ethiopian footballers
Sportspeople from Oromia Region
Ethiopia international footballers
2021 Africa Cup of Nations players